Oesophagicola is a monotypic genus of trematodes belonging to the family Opisthorchiidae. The only species is Oesophagicola laticaudae.

References

Platyhelminthes